George Moore may refer to:

Business
 George Moore (philanthropist) (1806–1876), English merchant and philanthropist
 George Moore (businessman) (1871–1947), New Zealand Salvation Army officer and businessman
 George S. Moore (1905–2000), chairman of Citigroup, 1967–1970

Entertainment
 George Moore (novelist) (1852–1933), George Augustus Moore, Irish novelist
 George Henry Moore (author) (1823–1892), American writer and librarian
 George Washington Moore (1820–1909), New York-born British music hall impresario
 George Moore (radio presenter), Australian radio DJ, announcer and host
 George N. Moore (1844–?), early photographer in the Pacific Northwest

Military
 George F. Moore (United States Army officer) (1887–1949), United States Army general
 George G. Moore (1844–1925), American Civil War soldier and Medal of Honor recipient
 George Moore (Medal of Honor) (1837–1904), Union Navy sailor and Medal of Honor recipient
 George Davis Moore (1867–1947), American general

Politics
 George Moore (SHK) (1709–1787), Manx politician
 George Moore (Dublin MP) (c. 1779–?), Member of Parliament for Dublin City, 1826–1831
 George Fletcher Moore (1798–1886), Attorney-General of Western Australia
 George Henry Moore (politician) (1811–1870), Irish landowner, politician and supporter of tenant rights
 George Moore (1811–1871), landowner and High Sheriff of Derbyshire
 George DeGraw Moore (1822–1891), American politician and jurist
 George Moore (Canadian politician) (1845–1916), businessman and politician in Ontario, Canada
 George F. Moore (lieutenant governor) (1861–1938), Democratic politician from Idaho
 George H. Moore (1871–1958), Los Angeles city councilman, 1943–1951
 George Dunbar Moore (1893–1979), Australian admiral and diplomat
 George Curtis Moore (1925–1973), American diplomat
 George J. Moore, Canadian-American lawyer and politician from New York

Religion and philosophy
 George Moore (priest) (died 1807), Archdeacon of Cornwall
 George Foot Moore (1851–1931), Asian scholar, historian of religion, Presbyterian minister
 G. E. Moore (George Edward Moore, 1873–1958), British philosopher

Science
 George Moore (physician) (1803–1880), physician, author, grandfather of G. E. Moore
 George E. Moore (1920–2008), American doctor and cancer research
 George Thomas Moore (1871–1956), botanist

Sports
 George Moore (cricketer) (1820–1916), Australian cricketer
 George Moore (footballer) (1884–?), English footballer for Birmingham
 George Moore (fencer) (1906–1977), British Olympic fencer
 George Moore (pentathlete) (1918–2014), American modern pentathlete
 George Moore (jockey) (1923–2008), Australian Hall of Fame jockey
 Stanley Moore (cricketer) (1886–1948), Australian cricketer, born George Stanley Moore
 George Moore (rugby league), Australian rugby player

Other
 George Moore (judge) (1878–1962), Missouri attorney and United States federal judge
 George F. Moore (judge), Texas Supreme Court judge in 1867
 George Henry Moore (runholder) (1812–1905), sheep station manager
 George W. Moore, billiards champion
 George Moore, a leading character in Tom Stoppard's 1972 play Jumpers

See also
 George F. Moore (disambiguation)
 George Moor (1896–1918), VC recipient
 George More (1553–1632), MP